Reza Ahadi (November 30, 1962 – January 17, 2016) was an Iranian footballer who played as a midfielder for the Iran national team and Tehran's Esteghlal. He died following an internal infection and liver problems at the age of 53.

Playing career
Ahadi played for Iranian club Esteghlal FC for most of his career, and also was among the first Iranian players to pursue a career in European football as he joined Germany’s Rot-Weiss Essen in 1986 where he scored a goal in his eight appearances. He was a member of the Iran national football team from 1982–1984.

The former Esteghlal captain was called up 13 times to the national team and scored twice. He was the manager of a handful of teams such as Esteghlal Ahvaz, Paykan, Kowsar and Payam Mashhad during his short coaching career.

He had introduced a number of Iranian players, including Vahid Talebloo, Khosro Heydari and Andranik Teymourian to professional soccer.

Achievements
4th Place 1989 Kuwait Peace & Friendship Tournament with Iran national football team
Winner 1990 Iranian Football League with Esteghlal FC

References

External links
 
 
 

1962 births
2016 deaths
Iranian footballers
Iran international footballers
Association football midfielders
Iranian expatriate footballers
Esteghlal F.C. players
Rot-Weiss Essen players
2. Bundesliga players
Expatriate footballers in Germany
1984 AFC Asian Cup players
Sportspeople from Tehran
20th-century Iranian people